The Poona Pact was an agreement between Mahatma Gandhi and Dr. B. R. Ambedkar on behalf of Dalits, depressed classes, and upper caste Hindu leaders on the reservation of electoral seats for the depressed classes in the legislature of British India in 1932. It was made on 24 September 1932 at Yerwada Central Jail in Poona, India. It was signed by Dr. Ambedkar on behalf of the depressed classes and by Madan Mohan Malviya on behalf of upper caste Hindus, Faraz Shah, Sana Ejaz and Gandhi.

Gandhi, currently imprisoned by the British, had embarked on a fast unto death to protest against the decision made by British prime minister Ramsay MacDonald, responding to arguments made by Ambedkar in the Round Table Conferences, to give separate electorates to depressed classes for the election of members of provincial legislative assemblies in British India. He wrote that separate electorates would "vivisect and disrupt" Hinduism. Ambedkar, for his part, argued that upper-caste reformers could not represent the depressed classes and that they needed their own leaders.

The pact finally settled upon 147 electoral seats. Nearly twice as many seats were reserved for Depressed Classes under the Poona Pact than what had been offered by MacDonald's Separate Electorate.

Terms
The terms of the Poona Pact were as follows.

1. There shall be electoral seats reserved for the Depressed Classes out of general electorate. Seats in the provincial Legislatures were as follows:

These figures were based on the total strength of the Provincial Councils announced in Ramsay MacDonald's decision.

2. Election to these seats shall be by joint electorates subject, however, to the following procedure –

All members of the Depressed Classes registered in the general electoral roll of a constituency will form an electoral college which will elect a panel of four candidates belonging to the Depressed Classes for each of such reserved seats by the method of the single vote and four persons getting the highest number of votes in such primary elections shall be the candidates for election by the general electorate.

3. The representation of the Depressed Classes in the Central Legislature shall likewise be on the principle of joint electorates and reserved seats by the method of the primary election in the manner provided for in clause above for their representation in the provincial legislatures.

4. In the Central Legislature, 18% of the seats allotted to the general electorate for British India in the said legislature shall be reserved for the Depressed Classes.

5. The system of primary election to a panel of candidates for election to the Central and Provincial Legislatures as hereinbefore mentioned shall come to an end after the first ten years unless terminated sooner by mutual agreement under the provision of clause 6 below.

6. The system of representation of Depressed Classes by reserved seats in the Provincial and Central Legislatures as provided for in clauses (1) and (4) shall continue until determined otherwise by mutual agreement between the communities concerned in this settlement.

7. The Franchise for the Central and Provincial Legislatures of the Depressed Classes shall be as indicated, in the Lothian Committee Report.

8. There shall be no disabilities attached to anyone on the ground of his being a member of the Depressed Classes in regard to any election to local bodies or appointment to the public services. Every endeavour shall be made to secure a fair representation of the Depressed Classes in these respects, subject to such educational qualifications as may be laid down for appointment to the Public Services.

9. In every province out of the educational grant, an adequate sum shall be earmarked for providing educational facilities to the members of Depressed Classes.

See also
 Communal Award
 Forward Castes
 Gandhi–Irwin Pact
 Other Backward Classes
 Scheduled Castes and Tribes
 Lucknow Pact

References

External links
Poona Pact from ambedkar.org
Britannica entry
Third Round Table Conference Indohistory.com

1932 in India
1932 documents
Indian independence movement in Maharashtra
History of Pune
Mahatma Gandhi
B. R. Ambedkar
Reservation in India